Automobile Quarterly was a hardbound, advertising-free periodical publication focused on collectible cars. The publication was known for quality writing and photography about automobiles, personalities and related subjects.

History and profile
The magazine started in Spring 1962 with the sub-title "The Connoisseur's Magazine of Motoring Today, Yesterday, and Tomorrow" or in the words of the founder—"a cross between The New Yorker and Encyclopædia Britannica in the world of auto mania". The founder and first editor was L. Scott Bailey (September 4, 1924, to June 26, 2012), working from offices in New York City.  In 1963, an "office of publication" was opened in Kutztown, Pennsylvania, which operated first as Automobile Quarterly, Inc.

Bailey retired to live in the English Cotswolds and CBS Magazines purchased Automobile Quarterly in 1986 and then sold the magazine to  Kutztown Publishing in 1988. In October 2000, Automobile Quarterly was sold to a newly formed company, Automobile Heritage Publishing & Communications, LLC, and relocated to New Albany, Indiana.

Vol. 52 (1) was the last issue published in 2012.

References

External links 
 Automobile Quarterly Volume 4 Issue 4 (in Google Books)

Automobile magazines published in the United States
Quarterly magazines published in the United States
Defunct magazines published in the United States
Magazines established in 1962
Magazines disestablished in 2012
Magazines published in Indiana
Magazines published in Pennsylvania